Thomas Dorsey may refer to:

Tom Dorsey (1927-1939), Pseudonym for Columbia Recording Artist Dan Hornsby 
Tommy Dorsey (1905–1956), bandleader and jazz trombone player
Thomas A. Dorsey (1899–1993), gospel composer and performer, known as Georgia Tom in his earlier jazz career
Thomas Beale Dorsey (1780–1855), American politician and judge in Maryland